Suban Pannon (born May 10, 1978 in Khon Kaen) is a Thai amateur boxer who won a gold medal at the 1998 Asian Games.

Career
Pannon won the 1998 Asian Games in the men's light flyweight division. He claimed the bronze medal in the same division one year earlier, at the 1999 World Amateur Boxing Championships in Houston, Texas.

He participated in the 2000 Summer Olympics for his native Southeast Asian country. There he was beaten in the second round of the light flyweight (– 48 kg) division by Ukraine's Valeriy Sydorenko. In this fight he lost because his ankle sprained during the bout.

At the 2002 Asian Games he medaled again.

He also participated in the 2004 Summer Olympics, but was stopped in the second round by Cuba's eventual winner Yan Bartelemí. Pannon qualified for the Athens Games by ending up in second place at the 1st AIBA Asian 2004 Olympic Qualifying Tournament in Guangzhou, PR China. In the final he lost to Tajikistan's Sherali Dostiev.

In 2005 Pannon competed for Thailand at the Boxing World Cup in Moscow, Russia, with one win and one loss. He competed at the 2006 Asian Games in the Light Flyweight (-48 kg) division and won the silver medal in a lost match against China's Zou Shiming 1-11.

Currently, he is a boxing coach for Thailand national amateur boxing team including a coach for the Myanmar national amateur boxing team for a while. For Thailand national team whose his students include Sudaporn Seesondee, who won a bronze medal in the women's Lightweight (-60 kg) division at 2020 Summer Olympics in Tokyo.

References
Notes

Sources
 1998 results
 Profile
 

1978 births
Living people
Light-flyweight boxers
Flyweight boxers
Boxers at the 2000 Summer Olympics
Boxers at the 2004 Summer Olympics
Suban Pannon
Asian Games medalists in boxing
Suban Pannon
Boxers at the 1998 Asian Games
Boxers at the 2002 Asian Games
Boxers at the 2006 Asian Games
Suban Pannon
AIBA World Boxing Championships medalists
Suban Pannon
Suban Pannon
Suban Pannon
Suban Pannon
Boxing trainers
Medalists at the 1998 Asian Games
Medalists at the 2002 Asian Games
Medalists at the 2006 Asian Games
Southeast Asian Games medalists in boxing
Suban Pannon
Competitors at the 2001 Southeast Asian Games